Chen Jianwen (born September 1965) is a Chinese politician, currently serving as head of Publicity Department of the CCP Guangdong Provincial Committee.

He is an alternate member of the 20th Central Committee of the Chinese Communist Party.

Biography
Chen was born in Longhai County (now Longhai District of Zhangzhou), Fujian, in September 1965. In 1982, he entered Fujian Normal University, where he majored in Chinese language and literature.

After graduating in 1986, he taught at the Fuzhou Branch of Fujian Radio and Television University. In 1993, he became a postgraduate at Beijing Normal University, where he worked after graduation. He joined the Chinese Communist Party (CCP) in December 1994.

Starting in April 2002, he served in several posts in the Publicity Department of the CCP Beijing Municipal Committee, including director of Publicity Department, director of Theory Department, and director of Cultural Department. From December 2009 to April 2011, he was a director of the Office of the Capital Spiritual Civilization Construction Committee.

In April 2011, he was assigned to the China Federation of Literary and Art Circles, where he eventually becoming vice chairman in January 2019.

Chen was appointed head of Publicity Department of the CCP Guangdong Provincial Committee in March 2021 and was admitted to member of the Standing Committee of the CCP Guangdong Provincial Committee, the province's top authority.

References

1965 births
Living people
People from Zhangzhou
Fujian Normal University alumni
Beijing Normal University alumni
Academic staff of Beijing Normal University
People's Republic of China politicians from Fujian
Chinese Communist Party politicians from Fujian
Alternate members of the 20th Central Committee of the Chinese Communist Party